Deering Oaks is a  public park in Portland, Maine, which has a baseball diamond, tennis courts, a playground, and a pond. It is located west of downtown Portland and is bordered by Deering Avenue on the west, Forest Avenue on the east, Park Avenue to the south and Interstate 295 to the north. State Street bisects the park. Access is from State Street, Deering Avenue, or Park Avenue. The Portland Farmers Market is located on the Park Avenue side of the park.  The park is listed on the National Register of Historic Places.

History

During King William's War, Benjamin Church helped defend the British settlers on this site in September 1689 against Canadiens, and tribes of the Wabanaki Confederacy.

The city had for some time been interested in the Deering Oaks property, part of a larger estate owned by the Deering family since the early 19th century.  In 1875, the Deerings offered the city  of land in exchange for a tax abatement, and the city agreed to the deal in 1879.  The park was developed by William Goodwin, the city's civil engineer, as part of an overall master plan for city parks developed by Frederick Law Olmsted.  Goodwin's vision largely survives today, except only for the loss of a small portion of the park's north side, for the construction of Interstate 295.

Deering Oaks Pond at one time filled and drained with the ocean tides; it was naturally connected to Back Cove until altered to suit roadways in the late 19th century. Deering Oaks also hosts the city's monument to the Spanish–American War, a casting of The Hiker by Theo Alice Ruggles Kitson. During the winter, one can ice skate on the frozen pond, and until the late 1990s, paddle boats could be rented during the summer season to explore the confines of the pond and enjoy the scenery.

In 2010, Deering Oaks hosted a rally calling for the repeal of the "Don't ask, don't tell" military policy; performer Lady Gaga among others spoke and the rally drew approximately 2,000 people.

Improvements
In 1994, the Portland City Council unanimously approved the Deering Oaks Master Plan for improving the park. The plan called for the closing of State Street where it bisects the park and the restoration of the original entrance at State St. and Park Avenue. As of 2004, the city had spent $3 million over 10 years on the park, including the building of a children's wading pool, the conversion of the Bowling Green Road to a pedestrian walkway and improvements to the sports facilities, including the tennis courts.

Bridge over Deering Oaks Ravine
An arched footbridge, measuring 40 feet in length, was built in 1911 spanning the Deering Oaks ravine. It cost the city $3,355. Portland also built 8-foot tall lamps on both sides of the bridge made of glass. It replaced a wooden bridge. In 2007, an engineering firm commissioned by the city estimated that cleaning, coating and repairing the bridge would cost $216,000. Funds were set aside from the capital improvement budget from 2007–2009 and work began in 2010. Along with other improvements, the city planned to install decorative cast-iron street lamps similar to the original lamps in the park. The new lights were expected to be made of polycarbonate, not glass, to eliminate vandalism.

Castle-in-the-Park
Deering Oak's Castle-in-the-Park was built in 1894 as a warming hut for ice skaters and is located next to the pond on the State Street side of the park. In 2004, work was done to restore the structure to its original Victorian style. The structure had hosted unattended public bathrooms for the previous 50 years. Friends of Deering Oaks, a community organization supporting the park, funded the $675,000 project.

Deering Oaks Pond

In 1996 Deering Oaks Pond served as the backdrop for an ice skating scene in the film "The Preacher's Wife" starring Whitney Houston and Denzel Washington. A Portland resident wrote that the Associated Press had reported at the time that 150 crew members cordoned off a portion of the park from the public for four days, and about 140 local people were plucked from an auditioning crowd of 6,000 to play extras in the scene—doing things in the background to make it look like a typical urban Christmas in a park:  skating, walking, snowball fights, etc.

In 2010, Portland received a federal grant worth $1.2 million to line the bottom of Deering Oaks Pond, with a local match of $540,000. The project was designed to promote water quality, which was harmed by algae blooms in the summer due to organic material settling on the bottom of the pond, and to prevent structural damage. Construction has begun on lining the bottom of the pond with cement. By covering the wetland soils this pond will no longer be spring fed; it will not sustain plant life and the ducks who live here will need to rely heavily on food from humans to survive, as their natural food supply will be cut off. It is not known whether cattails and other breeding habitat components will be restored as part of this project.

Deering Oaks Ravine 
The Ravine is a children's pool and splash area adjacent to the pond. When the park was first established, the Ravine had a spring-fed stream running through it. But in the 1930s, the spring was affected by nearby development resulting in the Portland Water District piping in water to run through the Ravine into the pond. In the 1950s, the pool was declared a public health hazard and filled in. In the 21st century, the Ravine was rebuilt as a shallow, granite-edged pool, a splash pad, and a reflecting pool sculpture with a ring of carved stones created by artist Carole Hanson called The Circle of Life.

See also
National Register of Historic Places listings in Portland, Maine

Notes

External links
[ Maine Historian article: Battle of Deering's Oaks]
Profile at Maine Tennis Association
Profile at YankeeMagazine.com
Deering Oaks Playground Profile at PlayAroundTown.com
Deering Oaks bridge, Portland, 1896 Maine Historical Society

Parks in Portland, Maine
Parks on the National Register of Historic Places in Maine
National Register of Historic Places in Portland, Maine
Parks established in 1879
1879 establishments in Maine